The Lyric Stage Company of Boston is the oldest professional theatre company in Boston. Founded in 1974, the non-profit theatre is located in the YWCA building at 140 Clarendon Street. It produces about seven plays and musicals each season and is known for its Stephen Sondheim musical productions.

History

Location 
Ron Ritchell and Polly Hogan found the Lyric Stage Company of Boston in 1974, with performances staged in the Community Church on Boylston Street. In 1976, the Lyric Stage moved to a theatre at 56 Charles Street. The stage was small, less than 300 square feet, and it sat 103. In 1991, the Lyric Stage moved to its current location in the YWCA Building at 140 Clarendon Street. The theatre has a large stage, a band loft, and seats 234.

Notable Productions 
In its first season, the Lyric Stage produced Antigone and The Second Man.

its first production at 54 Charles Street was The Importance of Being Earnest. 

The first production at 140 Clarendon was Red Hot & Cole. 

The Lyric Stage's production of Whoop-Dee-Doo! In the 1995-1996 season earned its first Elliot Norton Award for Outstanding Designer. 

The theatre's first large-scale musical production was Sunday in the Park with George in the 2001-2002 season. 

The 2014 production of Into the Woods is the highest grossing run in Lyric Stage history.

Community involvement 
In fulfilling its mission to support the Boston theatre scene, the Lyric Stage casts and hires local playwrights, actors, directors, designers, and musicians. Since its founding, the Lyric Stage has employed over 800 actors and 160 designers.

Fresh Ink Theatre Partnership 
Through its partnership with Fresh Ink Theatre, the Lyric Stage supports playwrights, actors and directors as they develop new works.

Lyric First Stage 
Lyric First Stage is a summer program designed to give young artists theatrical experience. Theatre professionals mentors teach a company of teenagers in music, text, and movement workshops. Each program culminates in a fully-staged production before a live audience.

Lyric First Curtain 
Lyric First Curtain is an initiative that allows Boston educators to include drama in their curriculum. The program gives students the opportunity to experience theatre, inaccessible to some, and delivers theatre education to local communities. Lyric First Curtain is currently in residence at McKinley School (Boston Public Schools) and at the Dudley Public Library.

Past productions 

Ref

References

External links
 The Lyric Stage Website

Theatres in Boston
1974 establishments in Massachusetts